Mamo is a common name for two species of extinct birds from Hawaii

Mamo may also refer to:

Given names
Mamo Clark (1914–1986), American actress and author
Mamo Osanai (born 1970), Japanese golfer
Mamo Wolde (1932–2002), Ethiopian runner

Surnames
Abel Mamo, Ethiopian footballer
Alessio Mamo, Italian artist and photojournalist
Anthony Mamo, Maltese politician
Aster Mamo, Ethiopian politician
Carlo Mamo, Maltese footballer
Esti Mamo, Ethiopian-born Israeli model and actress
Jake Mamo, Australian rugby league player

Other uses
Mamo (song), Russia's entry in the 2009 Eurovision contest
 MAMO Marseille Modulor, a contemporary art museum in Marseille 
A spiritual leader of the Kogi people